Ouellette Island is an island  west of Howard Island in southern Joubin Islands. Named by Advisory Committee on Antarctic Names (US-ACAN) for Gerald L. Ouellette, Chief Engineer in the Hero in her first voyage to Antarctica and Palmer Station in 1968.

See also 
 List of Antarctic and sub-Antarctic islands

References 

Islands of the Palmer Archipelago
Uninhabited islands